Dickie, McCamey & Chilcote is a United States-based law firm with approximately 190 attorneys and is ranked as the 214th largest law firm in the United States by the National Law Journal. The firm's headquarters are in Pittsburgh, Pennsylvania, and it has 20 offices nationwide.

History
Dickie, McCamey & Chilcote was founded in 1889 in Pittsburgh, where it maintained its only office until expanding to open an office in Wheeling, West Virginia in 1992 and several offices thereafter.

Offices
Dickie, McCamey & Chilcote is headquartered at PPG Place in Pittsburgh with offices in:

Buffalo, New York
Charlotte, North Carolina
Cleveland, Ohio
Columbus, Ohio
Denver, Colorado
Detroit, Michigan
Erie, Pennsylvania
Haddonfield, New Jersey
Harrisburg, Pennsylvania
Hollidaysburg, Pennsylvania
Lancaster, South Carolina
Lehigh Valley, Pennsylvania
Los Angeles, California
Philadelphia, Pennsylvania
Raleigh, North Carolina
Steubenville, Ohio
Wheeling, West Virginia
White Plains, New York
Wilmington, Delaware

Notable alumni
Attorneys who have practiced at Dickie, McCamey & Chilote include:

Judith Ference Olson, Judge of the Superior Court of Pennsylvania

References

External links

Official Website
Drug Crime Attorney

Law firms established in 1889
Law firms based in Pittsburgh
1889 establishments in Pennsylvania